Michael Doran (born April 25, 1962) is an American analyst of the international politics of the Middle East. He is a senior fellow at the Hudson Institute. He was previously a senior fellow at the Saban Center for Middle East Policy at the Brookings Institution.  He has been a visiting professor at the Robert F. Wagner Graduate School of Public Service at New York University. Prior to that, he was an assistant professor of Near Eastern Studies at Princeton University and taught at the University of Central Florida. He was appointed to the National Security Council and was also deputy assistant secretary for public diplomacy at the U.S. Department of Defense under the George W. Bush administration.

In a Foreign Affairs article, "Somebody Else's Civil War," he argued that the September 11 attacks were part of a religious conflict within the Muslim world. Doran said bin Laden, hoping that U.S. retaliation would unite the faithful against the West, sought to spark revolutions in Arab nations and elsewhere; the analyst argued that war with America was never the result, but was just a means to promote radical Islam. Doran supported the invasion of Iraq.

Doran’s advocacy on behalf of the government of Azerbaijan has been criticized for ignoring the authoritarian nature of Azerbaijan's government and its treatment of Armenians.

Education
Doran received his PhD in Near Eastern studies from Princeton University in 1997. His PhD advisor was L. Carl Brown. He attended Stanford University, graduating with a BA in history in 1984.

Career
Doran is senior fellow at the Hudson Institute, which he joined in 2014. Before that, he was a senior fellow at the Saban Center for Middle East Politics at the Brookings Institution.  Previously, he was a visiting professor, at New York University's Robert F. Wagner Graduate School for Public Service. Before returning to academia, he was appointed deputy assistant secretary for public diplomacy at the U.S. Department of Defense in April 2007 after being the senior director for Near East and North African affairs at the National Security Council from 2005 to 2007. His teaching career began at the University of Central Florida and he later joined the Near East Studies Department at Princeton University as assistant professor until he was appointed to the George W. Bush administration.

He has served as adjunct senior fellow at the Council on Foreign Relations and is a scholar with the Middle East Strategy at Harvard (MESH) project of the National Security Studies Program at Harvard University. He is a frequent book reviewer for The Washington Post.

Doran is known for his support of Israel, Turkey, and Azerbaijan. He has supported Azerbaijan's position in the Nagorno-Karabakh conflict, viewing it as an important ally against Iran.

Doran criticized the way the U.S. withdrew from Afghanistan in 2021.

Books
 Pan-Arabism Before Nasser: Egyptian Power Politics and the Palestine Question. 1999. Oxford University Press. .
 "What Carter Owes Begin". In Menachem Begin’s Zionist Legacy. 2015. Koren Publishers. .
 Ike's Gamble: America’s Rise to Dominance in the Middle East. 2016. Free Press. .

References

External links
 Profile in foreignaffairs.com
 Washington Post biography

Middle Eastern studies scholars
George W. Bush administration personnel
1962 births
Living people
Anti-Armenianism
American political scientists
New York University faculty
Princeton University faculty
Princeton University alumni
Stanford University alumni
Harvard University faculty
United States National Security Council staffers
Hudson Institute